Grantfork is a village in Madison County, Illinois, United States. The population was 341 as of the 2020 census. It is part of the St. Louis Metropolitan Area.

Geography
Illinois Route 160 passes through the west side of the village, leading south  to Highland and north  to Illinois Route 140.

The East Fork of Silver Creek, part of the Kaskaskia River watershed leading south to the Mississippi River, passes through the southeast corner of the village.

Demographics

As of the census of 2000, there were 254 people, 101 households, and 67 families residing in the village. The racial makeup of the village was 99.21% White, 0.39% Native American, and 0.39% from two or more races. Hispanic or Latino of any race were 0.39% of the population.

There were 101 households, out of which 37.6% had children under the age of 18 living with them, 50.5% were married couples living together, 8.9% had a female householder with no husband present, and 32.7% were non-families. 29.7% of all households were made up of individuals, and 8.9% had someone living alone who was 65 years of age or older. The average household size was 2.51 and the average family size was 3.09.

In the village, the population was spread out, with 29.1% under the age of 18, 7.1% from 18 to 24, 32.3% from 25 to 44, 22.4% from 45 to 64, and 9.1% who were 65 years of age or older. The median age was 36 years. For every 100 females, there were 92.4 males. For every 100 females age 18 and over, there were 97.8 males.

The median income for a household in the village was $42,917, and the median income for a family was $48,750. Males had a median income of $36,563 versus $21,458 for females. The per capita income for the village was $17,415. About 3.1% of families and 4.4% of the population were below the poverty line, including none of those under the age of eighteen or sixty five or over.

Notable person

 Rube Peters, pitcher for the Chicago White Sox and Brooklyn Tip-Tops; born in Grantfork

References

Villages in Madison County, Illinois
Villages in Illinois